Oliver Jasen Burke (born 7 April 1997) is a Scottish professional footballer who plays as a right winger for EFL Championship club Millwall, on loan from Bundesliga club Werder Bremen, and the Scotland national team.

He came through the academy at Nottingham Forest, signing a professional contract in September 2014 and making his debut the following February. In August 2016, Burke signed for Bundesliga club RB Leipzig for a reported fee of £13 million, a record fee for a Scottish player. A year later, having helped Leipzig to runners-up position in the league, he returned to England by signing for West Bromwich Albion for a fee of £15 million. Following an unsuccessful few years at West Bromwich Albion, in September 2020, Burke joined Sheffield United in a swap deal involving Callum Robinson.

Club career

Nottingham Forest
Burke was born in Kirkcaldy, Scotland, but grew up in Melton Mowbray, Leicestershire, England where he joined local club Mowbray Rangers aged eight. After one season at the club, he was scouted to join Nottingham Forest's Academy where he progressed for the next nine years. Burke signed his first professional contract with Nottingham Forest on 19 September 2014, before making his professional debut as an 87th-minute substitute during a 3–1 defeat against Tottenham Hotspur on 24 September. He made his league debut on 14 February 2015 as a 64th-minute substitute in a 4–4 draw away to Blackpool.

Burke was sent on a month-long loan to League One club Bradford City on 24 February. He made his debut for them on the same day, playing for 75 minutes in a 2–1 loss away to Swindon Town. Burke made another start on 28 February in a 2–0 loss against Peterborough United and appeared twice as an unused substitute before returning to his parent club. After his loan spell at Bradford City came to an end, Burke signed a three-year contract with Forest.

Ahead of the 2015–16 season, Burke signed another three-year contract with the club on 29 July. Burke played for the club's reserves until December when he was called up to the first team by manager Dougie Freedman, who Burke considered his mentor. On 29 December, Burke scored his first goal for Forest from a curling shot hit with the outside of his right foot against Cardiff City. His goal opened the scoring at the Cardiff City Stadium nine minutes into the game, which ended 1–1. Burke scored his second goal for the club on 16 January 2016 in a 3–0 win over Bolton Wanderers. His performance once again earned a contract extension on a four-year deal on 29 February. Burke ended the 2015–16 season having made twenty-one appearances in all competitions and scoring twice.

Ahead of the 2016–17 season Burke made an impression in the pre-season friendlies, scoring three times in six matches. Under the new management of Philippe Montanier, Burke scored in the opening game of the season, a 4–3 win over Burton Albion, and scored a brace two weeks later against Wigan Athletic. Burke scored on his final appearance for Forest on 27 August, a 3–1 defeat of Leeds United. Burke's early season form and performances attracted the interest of leading European and Premier League clubs, such as Bayern Munich, Manchester United, Sunderland and Liverpool. However, Montanier dismissed suggestions of Burke leaving Forest.

RB Leipzig
On 28 August 2016, in a move that caused outrage among Forest supporters, who criticised the club's owner Fawaz Al-Hasawi, Burke joined newly promoted Bundesliga club RB Leipzig on a five-year contract for an undisclosed fee. The deal was reported by BBC Sport to be worth around £13 million, which set a new record for a transfer involving a Scottish player.

On his debut for Leipzig, a home Bundesliga game against Borussia Dortmund on 10 September, Burke came on after 69 minutes in place of Yussuf Poulsen and provided an assist for Naby Keïta to score the only goal. Fifteen days later he opened the scoring in a 1–1 draw at 1. FC Köln, becoming the first Scot to score in Germany's top flight since Brian O'Neil for VfL Wolfsburg in November 1999.

Despite this early impact, Burke was regularly used as a substitute by Leipzig. Their coaching staff praised his physical attributes, but questioned his tactical awareness.

West Bromwich Albion
Burke returned to English football on 25 August 2017, moving to Premier League side West Bromwich Albion for a reported fee of £15 million, breaking his own record as the most expensive Scottish footballer. He signed a five-year contract at the West Midlands club. Burke said that he chose West Bromwich Albion as a way to have more game time, even though with Leipzig he could play in the Champions League.

He made his debut two days later, replacing goalscorer Jay Rodriguez for the final two minutes of a 1–1 home draw against Stoke City. Owing to hamstring injury, he made only one other substitute appearance by mid-November and took part with the under-21 team in the EFL Trophy, scoring in a 2–1 group stage defeat at Coventry City on 7 November.

On 14 August 2018, Burke scored his first goal for the Baggies, the game's only in a home win over Luton Town in the first round of the EFL Cup. He made only six total appearances in the first half of the season, of which three were in the Championship, all from the bench.

Burke moved on loan to Celtic on 5 January 2019 until the end of the season. He made his debut two weeks later, playing the full 90 minutes of a 3–0 home win over Airdrieonians in the Scottish Cup. On 23 January, his Scottish Premiership debut, he played as a striker in the absence of Leigh Griffiths and Odsonne Édouard and netted twice in a 4–0 win against St Mirren at Celtic Park, his first league goals since September 2016.

Loan to Alavés
On 30 August 2019, Burke was loaned to La Liga club Alavés for the season. Burke made his debut for his new club in their 1–0 defeat to Sevilla on 15 September. He scored his first goal for Alavés in a 2–1 La Liga win over Eibar on 7 February 2020.

Sheffield United
Sheffield United signed Burke from West Brom in September 2020, with Callum Robinson moving in the opposite direction. Burke signed a three-year contract with the Blades. He scored his first goal for the club in a 2–1 away league win over Manchester United on 27 January 2021, clinching the Blades' first league win over the Red Devils since 1992 and their first win at Old Trafford in Premier League history, as their last victory there took place in 1973.

Millwall (loan)
On 21 January 2022, Burke joined Championship rivals Millwall on loan until the end of the 2021–22 season.

Werder Bremen
In June 2022 Burke returned to the Bundesliga, joining newly promoted Werder Bremen from Sheffield United. He reportedly moved on a free transfer.

Burke scored his first goal for Bremen on 13 August 2022, netting late to secure a 2–2 draw with VfB Stuttgart. A week later, he scored the decisive goal in a dramatic, come-from-behind 3–2 win at Borussia Dortmund.

In January 2023 Burke returned to former club Millwall on a loan until the end of the season.

International career
Burke was eligible to play for England in addition to Scotland, having been brought up south of the border from a young age, but he opted to play for his country of birth. He was first called up by Scotland U19 and scored on his debut for the team, a 3–1 win against Mexico U18, on 6 October 2015. He went on to make six appearances for the side.

Burke received his first call-up to the senior Scotland squad on 10 March 2016 for their friendly match against Denmark. He made his debut as an 82nd-minute substitute for goalscorer Matt Ritchie in the 1–0 win at Hampden Park 19 days later. 

He was left out of the full squad in June 2017 and was instead selected for an under-20 squad in the 2017 Toulon Tournament.  Burke scored both goals in a 3–2 defeat against the Czech Republic. As captain, Scotland claimed a historic first ever victory against Brazil at any level, in the second match. The team would win the bronze medal. It was the nations first ever medal at the competition.

During the 2017–18 season, Burke was selected in the under-21 squad. He made his debut at that level on 5 September, and he scored the first goal in a 2–0 win against the Netherlands. In the 2018 Toulon Tournament, Burke scored goals against France and South Korea as Scotland finished in fourth place. In the third-place play-off against Turkey, he was the only player to miss in the penalty shootout defeat, with Altay Bayındır saving his attempt.

Burke was recalled to the full international squad in March 2019 and scored his first senior goal in Scotland's 2–1 victory over Cyprus on 8 June the same year.

Career statistics

Club

International

Scores and results list Scotland's goal tally first, score column indicates score after each Burke goal.

Honours
Celtic
Scottish Premiership: 2018–19

References

External links
 
 
 

1997 births
Living people
Footballers from Kirkcaldy
Sportspeople from Melton Mowbray
Footballers from Leicestershire
Anglo-Scots
Scottish footballers
Scottish expatriate footballers
Scotland youth international footballers
Scotland international footballers
Association football wingers
Nottingham Forest F.C. players
Bradford City A.F.C. players
West Bromwich Albion F.C. players
RB Leipzig players
Celtic F.C. players
Deportivo Alavés players
Sheffield United F.C. players
Millwall F.C. players
SV Werder Bremen players
English Football League players
Bundesliga players
Scottish Professional Football League players
La Liga players
Premier League players
Expatriate footballers in Germany
Expatriate footballers in Spain
Scottish expatriate sportspeople in Germany
Scottish expatriate sportspeople in Spain
Scotland under-21 international footballers